Iapetus is a Titan in Greek mythology.

Iapetus  may also refer to:
Iapetus (moon), one of the planet Saturn's moons, named for the mythological Titan
Iapetus Ocean, an ancient ocean between the paleocontinents Laurentia and Baltica
Iapetus suture, line of closure of the Iapetus Ocean